William Penman (1886 – August 1907) was a Scottish professional footballer who played as a centre half.

Career
Born in Falkirk, Penman joined Bradford City from Ashfield in August 1906. He made 15 league appearances for the club, scoring once, as well as scoring 1 goal in 3 FA Cup games. He died from pneumonia in August 1907.

Sources

References

1886 births
1907 deaths
Scottish footballers
Ashfield F.C. players
Bradford City A.F.C. players
English Football League players
Association football defenders
Deaths from pneumonia in the United Kingdom